Lorraine Juliette Botha (2 July 1965 – 31 August 2022) was a South African politician. A member of the Democratic Alliance, she was a Member of the Western Cape Provincial Parliament from 2014 up to her death. Botha served as the chief whip of the DA caucus from May 2022 until her death in August 2022. She was the chairperson of the Standing Committee on Education from 2019 until 2022.

Western Cape Provincial Parliament
Botha was a member of the Democratic Alliance. In May 2014, she was elected to the Western Cape Provincial Parliament. She was then elected chairperson of the department of the premier committee.

In 2016, she was elected chairperson of the standing committee on health and social development. Following her re-election in May 2019, Botha became chairperson of the standing committee on education.

On 12 May 2022, Botha was appointed the new chief whip of the DA caucus in the provincial parliament. She replaced Mireille Wenger, who was appointed to the Provincial Cabinet.

Death
Botha suffered a heart attack and died after collapsing suddenly on Wednesday, 31 August 2022, while at work, according to the DA’s provincial leader Tertuis Simmers. Her husband, Johan, died in January 2021.

References

External links
Hon Lorraine Botha – Western Cape Provincial Parliament

2022 deaths
1965 births
Coloured South African people
Democratic Alliance (South Africa) politicians
Members of the Western Cape Provincial Parliament
21st-century South African politicians
21st-century South African women politicians